Arthur Adams Small, Jr. (October 14, 1933 – October 3, 2015) was an American lawyer and politician in the state of Iowa. He served in the Iowa House of Representatives from 1971 to 1979, and in the Iowa State Senate from 1979 to 1987, as a Democrat.

Early life
Small was born in Brunswick, Maine. He attended Bowdoin College, and served in the United States Army. He later earned a master's degree in English from the University of Iowa.

Legislative career
While serving in the Iowa General Assembly, Small entered law school at the age of forty-eight, earning a law degree from the University of Iowa College of Law. In 1986, Small ran unsuccessfully for Lieutenant Governor of Iowa.

Post-legislative career
From 1987 to 2000, Small practiced law and worked as a lobbyist representing a variety of clients. He lived in Iowa City, Iowa. In 2004, Small ran unsuccessfully for U.S. Senate. He died, aged 81, on October 3, 2015, in Iowa City of kidney failure.

References

1933 births
2015 deaths
Politicians from Brunswick, Maine
Politicians from Iowa City, Iowa
Bowdoin College alumni
University of Iowa alumni
University of Iowa College of Law alumni
Iowa lawyers
Democratic Party Iowa state senators
Democratic Party members of the Iowa House of Representatives
Deaths from kidney failure
20th-century American lawyers